Doetsch is a surname. Notable people with the surname include:

Alexander Dreymon, (born 1983 as Alexander Doetsch), a German actor
Gustav Doetsch (1892–1977), German mathematician, aviation researcher
Henry Doetsch (1839–1894), German-born industrialist who lived in London

See also
Dietsch (surname)
Dotsch